Falcinelli is an Italian surname. Notable people with the surname include:

 Amleto Falcinelli (1921–1996), Italian boxer, after whom asteroid  was named
 Diego Falcinelli, Italian footballer

See also
7963 Falcinelli, a main-belt asteroid

Italian-language surnames